John Kennard (born 11 February 1959) is a rally co-driver born in Christchurch, New Zealand.

Rally career

Kennard has been a co-driver to numerous drivers, the most notable being Hayden Paddon at Hyundai motorsport.

In March 2017 it was announced that Kennard would step down as Paddon's co-driver after Rally Finland and that a replacement for Kennard would be announced soon. The replacement was confirmed the day after to be Kevin Abbring's co-driver Sebastian Marshall.

Kennard suffered a hip injury prior to the 2017 Rally de Portugal, which meant Marshall had to substitute for Kennard for the rally. On 30 May, Kennard retired as co-driver earlier than what was planned, because of the injury.

Kennard was voted Marlborough Sportsperson of the Year in 2016, succeeding Sophie MacKenzie.

Rally victories

WRC victories

Rally results

WRC results

* Season still in progress.

References

External links

eWRC

1959 births
Living people
New Zealand rally co-drivers
Sportspeople from Palmerston North
World Rally Championship co-drivers